Pansy Helen Auld Chapman  (24 November 1892 – 6 July 1973) was a New Zealand hospital matron and nursing administrator. She was born in Blacks Point, West Coast, New Zealand, on 24 November 1892.

In the 1948 New Year Honours, Chapman was appointed a Member of the Order of the British Empire.

References

1892 births
1973 deaths
People from the West Coast, New Zealand
New Zealand nurses
New Zealand Members of the Order of the British Empire
New Zealand women nurses